Saint-Jean-des-Ollières (Auvergnat: Sant Joan de las Olèiras) is a commune in the Puy-de-Dôme department in Auvergne-Rhône-Alpes in central France.

See also
 Communes of the Puy-de-Dôme department

References
 INSEE commune file

Saintjeandesollieres